1st Regiment Infantry National Guard of Philadelphia, also known as the Spirit of '61, is a bronze statue by Henry Kirke Bush-Brown installed in Philadelphia at the Union League Club, 140 South Broad Street, Center City – adjacent to John Wilson's sculpture Washington Grays Monument.

History
Commissioned in 1911 by the First Regiment, Infantry of the National Guard of Pennsylvania for that organization's 50th anniversary, this sculpture was installed in front of the Union League building on Broad Street, Philadelphia in 1911, and deeded to the Union League of Philadelphia in 1962 in celebration of the First Regiment's centennial anniversary.

Physical description
The sculpture depicts a Civil War-era soldier marching in full uniform as a member of the First Regiment, Infantry of the National Guard of Pennsylvania. A successor regiment of the Gray Reserves, which was established in 1822, the First Regiment was called to action following the mid-April 1861 Fall of Fort Sumter. The plaque on the sculpture’s base was inscribed with the words: "First Regiment Infantry/National Guard of Pennsylvania/Grays Reserves/1861 April–1911."

See also
 List of public art in Philadelphia

References

External links
 "Political Notes: Unmistakable Republican," Time, October 28, 1946
 "First Regiment Philadelphia, PA" (photo), by Seth Gaines (© July 16, 2006)

Outdoor sculptures in Philadelphia
1911 sculptures
Bronze sculptures in Pennsylvania
Statues in Pennsylvania
Sculptures of men in Pennsylvania
1911 establishments in Pennsylvania
Monuments and memorials in Philadelphia